Diaphus roei, the small lanternfish, is a species of lanternfish 
found in the Philippines and the Western Central Atlantic Ocean.

Etymology
The fish is named in honor of Richard N. Roe (1936–2016), of the National Marine Fisheries Service (NMFS), Southeast Fisheries Center, in Pascagoula, Mississippi, who obtained specimens collected from the NMFS research vessel Oregon.

References

Myctophidae
Taxa named by Basil Nafpaktitis
Fish described in 1974